Ammachattiram is a village in the Annavasal revenue block of Pudukkottai district, Tamil Nadu, India.

Demographics 

As per the 2011 census, Ammachattiram had a total population of 2786  with 1402 males and 1384 females. The literacy rate was 66.54%

References

Villages in Pudukkottai district